Joseph Dufour, dit Bona (October 7, 1744 – December 15, 1829) was a farmer and political figure in Lower Canada.

He was born Joseph-Michel Dufour at Petite-Rivière in 1744. He married Charlotte, the daughter of Guillaume Tremblay, in 1771 and went to live on Île aux Coudres. He supported his family by farming and hunting belugas. The seigneur of the island was the Séminaire de Québec and, on occasion, Dufour acted as their agent. He was selected as one of the two millers on the island. By 1792, Dufour had been named a captain in the local militia and, in that year, was elected to the 1st Parliament of Lower Canada for  Northumberland. At 6 feet 7 inches in height, he was easily the tallest member of the assembly. Dufour was promoted to lieutenant-colonel in the militia in 1794 and served until his resignation in 1825. His wife died in 1792; his eldest daughter died the following year and he was left with two young daughters.

Dufour died at Île aux Coudres in 1829. One of his sons-in-law inherited his assets.

References
 
 

1744 births
1829 deaths
Members of the Legislative Assembly of Lower Canada
People from Capitale-Nationale